A 2011 special election in New York's 9th congressional district was held on September 13, 2011 to fill a seat in the U.S. Congress for New York's 9th congressional district, after Representative Anthony Weiner resigned from the seat on June 21, 2011 due to his sexting scandal. Democratic Party nominee David Weprin, a member of the New York State Assembly, faced Republican and Conservative Party nominee Bob Turner, a businessman who had unsuccessfully sought the seat in 2010.

The district with over 300,000 registered voters was expected to be eliminated during the 2012 redistricting. It is strongly Democratic, where registered Democrats out number Republican by a 3-to-1 ratio.

Around midnight on September 14, the Associated Press called the race for Republican Bob Turner with 70% of precincts reporting and Turner leading Weprin 53% to 47%. Turner is the first Republican Congressman to represent this district in 88 years. The last Republican to represent the district was Andrew Petersen, who was elected in the Harding landslide of 1920.

Schedule
On July 1, 2011, Governor Andrew Cuomo called the special election for September 13, concurrent with state primary elections, and with special elections for six vacant seats in the New York State Assembly.  The deadline for the selection and approval of each party's nominee was July 19. Independent candidates also had the opportunity to petition their way onto the ballot collecting 3,500 signatures by July 13, and had a deadline of July 18. The last day for the state and county boards to certify the ballot was July 22.

Nomination process
Each of the six qualified New York parties (Democratic, Republican, Conservative, Working Families, Independence, and Green) had the opportunity to nominate candidates; the Green Party did not nominate a candidate. As the majority of the District lies within the county of Queens, each party's chairperson of this county chose the nominees: for the Democratic Party, Queens Democratic chairman, Joseph Crowley, a member of the U.S. House (representing the neighboring ), and for the Republican Party, Queens Republican chairman Phil Ragusa, an accountant.

Candidates

Democratic
David Weprin, a member of the New York State Assembly, was announced as the Democratic nominee on July 7, 2011. Weprin did not live in the 9th district, but rather in Holliswood, Queens in the 5th district. However, as with Kathy Hochul in the 26th district election held upstate earlier in the year, this did not disqualify Weprin from seeking or holding the office; the U.S. Constitution requires only that a person be a resident of the state which he or she represents, not specifically a district. Weprin was believed to have been nominated to serve as a placeholder who would not seek re-election should the district have been eliminated in the 2012 redistricting  (which subsequently happened).

Republican
Bob Turner, former CEO of Multimedia Entertainment best known for producing The Jerry Springer Show, was chosen as the Republican nominee on July 8, 2011, after  Councilman Eric Ulrich declined to run and Juan D. Reyes backed out of contention. Turner had been a candidate for the 9th district in 2010, and was defeated by Weiner by a 39% to 61% margin.

Third parties

Conservative
The Conservative Party of New York State endorsed Republican nominee Bob Turner in a July 9 meeting.

Working Families
The Working Families Party endorsed Democratic nominee David Weprin on July 11.

Independence
The Independence Party of New York endorsed Democratic nominee David Weprin on July 10.

Liberal
The Liberal Party of New York endorsed Republican nominee Bob Turner. The Liberal Party has not had automatic ballot access since 2002 and did not petition for it in this race.

Socialist Workers
The Socialist Workers Party organized a one-week petitioning effort to collect the 3,500 signatures necessary to get its candidate, Christopher Hoeppner, onto the special election ballot. Hoeppner and the SWP submitted 7,080 signatures and qualified for the ballot.

General election

Campaign
The seat was originally considered safe for Democrats, as registered Democrats outnumber Republicans three to one in the district, but the race soon turned into a toss-up, and a referendum on President Barack Obama and his party. Obama's support, or lack thereof, of Israel in particular emerged as top issue in the district, with its thirty some percent Jewish voters.

In early August, a Siena poll showed Weprin leading with six percent, but four days before the election the poll showed Turner leading by six points, and a poll done by Public Policy Polling (PPP) two days later showed the same result, which was attributed to the unpopularity of President Obama, who had already underperformed his Democratic predecessors in the district in 2008, and the issue of Israel. PPP's president commented that "If Republicans win this race...it's real-world evidence of how unpopular Barack Obama is right now. Approval polls are one thing, but for the GOP to win in a heavily Democratic district like this would send a strong message about how unhappy voters are".

By August 24, Weprin reported raising $451,000, double the $204,000 raised by Turner. Weprin had the assistance of labor unions and strong local party organizations, and received additional financial support from national Democrats, who spent more than $600,000 on television advertisements criticizing Turner. Senator Joseph Lieberman endorsed him, Governor Andrew Cuomo and former President Bill Clinton recorded automated phone calls to voters for him, and New York Senator Charles Schumer and City Council speaker Christine Quinn campaigned with him. Turner had the support of former New York Mayor Rudolph Giuliani and former Governor George Pataki who made appearances with him. He also had the support of Assemblyman Dov Hikind, and former New York mayor Ed Koch, both Democrats and Jews.

Weprin, an Orthodox Jew whom Tablet Magazine described as "a nebbish-ey mustachioed man with a limp handshake and what appears to be a toupee" led a gaffe-prone campaign: When asked by the New York Daily News, he estimated the national debt at $4 trillion instead of $14 trillion it was at that time, and later blamed Hurricane Irene as the reason for bowing out of a scheduled debate against Turner, a day after the hurricane had passed. In early September, Weprin's campaign was accused of sending volunteers to spy on Turner's campaign. Members of Weprin's campaign denied involvement. Weprin did not deny the allegations, but denied knowledge, saying "I'm the candidate. I can't control who goes to everything."

Turner portrayed the race as a referendum on President Obama's policies and linked Weprin to the President. In the debate about the mosque near Ground Zero, Weprin has defended the "right of the mosque to build on that site". Turner chastised both him and Obama for this attitude in an advertisement, featuring images of the World Trade Center in flames.

Turner advocated that the federal budget has to be cut by as much as a third, and he also wanted to lower taxes. He insisted that the cuts would not necessarily mean reducing benefits for those who depend on government funds, particularly Social Security and Medicare.  The New York Times, who endorsed Weprin, said of Turner's position: "[t]hat would take a magician, not a businessman".

Turner, a Roman Catholic, appealed to Jewish voters by criticizing President Obama's policies on Israel, and portraying Weprin, who is strongly pro-Israel, as being insufficiently critical of Obama's stance on Israel. Former New York mayor Ed Koch supported Turner in order to send a message to President Obama "that he can no longer take the Jewish community for granted" and to change what Koch described as "hostile position on the State of Israel". Koch was accused of supporting Turner out of revenge for Weprin's father Saul Weprin's not supporting him in his race for governor in 1982, but Koch denied this.

Weprin's vote in favor of legalizing same-sex marriage in the Assembly in June 2011, angered many religious Jews, who make up for about a third of the Jewish voters, and led to some Flatbush Orthodox rabbis issuing a letter prohibiting Jews from voting for Weprin or donating time or money to his campaign. Turner, who opposes same-sex marriage, avoided making it an issue in the campaign, following Ed Koch's advice. However, he was supported by local rabbis as well as Assemblyman Dov Hikind for being against gay marriage.

Polling

Results

County Results

Impact
The Republican upset victory is seen as a result of frustration with the weak national economy and considered a referendum on President Obama's economic policies. Commentators and politicians have also stated that the outcome of the election indicates that concerns about Obama's stance on Israel may have played a role in the election. The district has a substantial number of Jewish voters, particularly in Brooklyn, where Weprin lost 33 to 67. Many of them are ultra-Orthodox, who, while socially conservative, are fiscal liberals and sometimes will vote Republican or Russian immigrants, who tend to be politically conservative. Former New York mayor Ed Koch called the Republican win "a message to President Obama that he cannot throw Israel under a bus with impunity".

National Jewish Democratic Council President David A. Harris on the other hand stated: "One thing we know beyond the shadow of a doubt is that this election was about many things, but not Israel". The chairwoman of the Democratic National Committee, Debbie Wasserman Schultz, whose congressional district in South Florida comprises many Jewish voters, denied national ramifications saying that the district's large concentration of Orthodox Jews, who tend not to vote Democratic, made it unusual. However, Turner was the only elected Republican official from areas comprising the 9th district.

Turner's victory had implications on how the political boundaries of the state of New York were drawn in 2012. The 9th district was one of the two districts to be eliminated, as the state lost congressional seats because of population changes. Turner considered running for reelection. Turner nonetheless bowed out of the race after the 9th district was mostly dissolved into the newly formed 6th district, which will have a greater Asian population and an even greater Democratic advantage; Turner instead ran for the U.S. Senate seat up for election in 2012, losing.

References

External links
Bob Turner for US Congress
David Weprin for US Congress

9th congressional district special election
New York 09
2011 09 special
New York 2011 09
New York 2011 09
United States House of Representatives 2011 09